Chatrai is a village in Krishna district of the Indian state of Andhra Pradesh. It is located in Chatrai mandal of Nuzvid revenue division.

References 

Villages in Krishna district
Mandal headquarters in Krishna district